Jukul Bandan (also Romanized as Jūkūl Bandān; also known as Jokleh Bandān, Jokol Bandān, Jokolmandān, and Jowkol Bandān) is a village in Saravan Rural District, Sangar District, Rasht County, Gilan Province, Iran. At the 2006 census, its population was 114, in 29 families.

References 

Populated places in Rasht County